Filippo Mondelli (18 June 1994 – 29 April 2021) was an Italian rower, gold medallist at the 2018 European Rowing Championships and at the 2018 World Rowing Championships in the men's quadruple sculls.

In February 2020 he was reported to be suffering from osteosarcoma in his left leg. He died in Cernobbio in April 2021, at the age of 26.

References

External links

1994 births
2021 deaths
Deaths from bone cancer
Italian male rowers
World Rowing Championships medalists for Italy
Sportspeople from Como
Rowers of Fiamme Gialle
Deaths from cancer in Lombardy